The white-bellied big-eared bat (Micronycteris minuta) is a bat species from South and Central America, as well as Trinidad and Tobago in the Caribbean.

References

Micronycteris
Bats of Central America
Bats of South America
Bats of Brazil
Bats of the Caribbean
Mammals of Colombia
Mammals described in 1856
Taxa named by Paul Gervais